Harry Bekkering (born in 1944 in Roosteren) is a Dutch cultural scientist. He is an author and an associate professor at the Katholieke Universiteit Nijmegen.

Bekkering was born in 1944 in Roosteren. For several years he was professor of Language and Culture Studies at the Radboud University Nijmegen, specializing in children's and youth literature. He obtained his doctorate for research into Simon Vestdijk's essayistics. In the 1980s and 1990s he was a board member and chairman of the Vestdijkkring. He was also a board member of the Jan Campert Foundation. In 1989 he published is first book De eeuw van Sien en Otje. De twintigste eeuw, followed by De hele Bibelebontse berg: De geschiedenis van het kinderboek in Nederland & Vlaanderen van de Middeleeuwen tot heden, published the same year with Querido in Amsterdam.

Works 
 De eeuw van Sien en Otje. De twintigste eeuw (1989) 
 De hele Bibelebontse berg (1989) 
 Veroverde traditie. De poëticale opvattingen van S. Vestdijk (1989) 
 De bloemlezing als breekijzer (1997) 
 Ik had wel duizend levens en ik nam er maar één! Cees Nooteboom (1997)

References

External links 
Harry Bekkering at the Digital Library for Dutch Literature (in Dutch)

Living people
1944 births
Dutch literary historians
Academic staff of Radboud University Nijmegen
People from Echt-Susteren
20th-century Dutch non-fiction writers
20th-century Dutch male writers